T48 or T-48 may refer to:

 Cessna YT-48, a development of the T-37 trainer
 T-48 MPATS, the 2000s U.S. Navy proposed trainer aircraft
 T48 Gun Motor Carriage, A 57 mm gun motor carriage produced by the U.S. in World War II.
 T48 (rifle), an American variant of the Belgian FN FAL battle rifle